Belleview is a historic home located near Middletown, New Castle County, Delaware.  It was built about 1845, and is a three-story "L"-shaped five-by-five bay, brick structure.  It has a shallow hipped roof with wide overhanging eaves and bracketed cornice in the Italianate style.

It was listed on the National Register of Historic Places in 1985.

References

Houses on the National Register of Historic Places in Delaware
Italianate architecture in Delaware
Houses completed in 1845
Houses in New Castle County, Delaware
National Register of Historic Places in New Castle County, Delaware